Qarah Aghaj-e Olya may refer to:
 Qarah Aghaj-e Olya, West Azerbaijan
 Qarah Aghaj-e Olya, Zanjan